Yevgeniya Ivanovna Sechenova (17 August 1918 – 25 June 1990) was a Soviet sprint runner who won six medals at the European championships in 1946 and 1950. She was part of the Soviet 4 × 200 m relay team that set world records in 1950 and 1951. She also competed in the 200 m and 4 × 100 m relay at the 1952 Summer Olympics and finished fourth in the relay.

Sechenova won 20 national titles in 100 m (1940, 1946, 1947, 1949, 1950), 200 m (1939, 1940, 1944, 1949), 4 × 100 m (1939, 1940, 1946, 1949–1951) and 4 × 200 m (1946, 1948–1951). She was awarded the Order of the Red Banner of Labour.

References

1918 births
1990 deaths
Soviet female sprinters
Olympic athletes of the Soviet Union
Athletes (track and field) at the 1952 Summer Olympics
European Athletics Championships medalists
Sportspeople from Sevastopol
Olympic female sprinters